Beulah Valley is a census-designated place (CDP) in and governed by Pueblo County, Colorado, United States. The CDP is a part of the Pueblo, CO Metropolitan Statistical Area. The population of the Beulah Valley CDP was 518 at the United States Census 2020. The Beulah post office  serves the area.

Bishop Castle, constructed by Jim Bishop, otherwise known as a "one man castle", is located between Beulah and San Isabel, Colorado.

Geography

Demographics

See also

 List of census-designated places in Colorado

References

External links

 Beulah Valley @ UncoverColorado.com
 Mace's Hole: A History of Bandits, Brigands, and Beulah
 Pueblo County website

Census-designated places in Pueblo County, Colorado
Census-designated places in Colorado